The  was a Japanese domain of the Edo period. It was associated with  Iwami Province in modern-day Shimane Prefecture.

In the han system, Hamada was a political and economic abstraction based on periodic cadastral surveys and projected agricultural yields.  In other words, the domain was defined in terms of kokudaka, not land area. This was different from the feudalism of the West.

History
The domain came to an end with its conquest by forces of the Chōshū Domain and its subsequent absorption of Hamada into Chōshū territory.

List of daimyōs 
The hereditary daimyōs were head of the clan and head of the domain.

Yoshida clan, 1619–1648 (tozama; 54,000 koku)
 Shigeharu 
 Shigetsune 

Matsudaira (Matsui) clan, 1649–1759 (fudai; 50,000 koku)
Yasuteru
Yasuhiro
Yasukazu
Yasutoshi
Yasuyoshi

Honda clan, 1759–1769 (fudai; 50,000 koku)
Tadahiro
Tadamitsu
Tadatoshi

Matsudaira (Matsui) clan, 1769–1836 (fudai; 70,000 koku)
Yasuyoshi
Yasusada
Yasutō
Yasutaka

Matsudaira (Ochi) clan, 1836–1866 (Shinpan; 61,000 koku)
Nariatsu
Takeoki
Takeshige
Takeakira

See also 
 List of Han
 Abolition of the han system

References

External links
 "Hamada" at Edo 300 

Domains of Japan
Honda clan
Matsudaira clan
Matsui-Matsudaira clan